"Middledistancerunner" is the second official single taken from the 2010 Chicane album Giants. It features American musician and vocalist Adam Young (of Owl City). The single was digitally released 1 August 2010.

Music video
A music video has been made to accompany the DC Rework Edit of the song.

Track listing

Charts

References 

2010 singles
Chicane (musician) songs
2010 songs
Songs written by Chicane (musician)